Mount Howard is a dark, rounded mountain, 1,460 m, standing 8 nautical miles (15 km) southeast of Mount Joyce in the Prince Albert Mountains, Victoria Land, Antarctica. Discovered by the Discovery Expedition, 1901–04, which named it for Lord Howard de Walden who assisted Captain R.F. Scott in his experiments with sledges. The geographical feature lies situated on the Pennell Coast, a portion of Antarctica lying between Cape Williams and Cape Adare.

References
 

Howard
Pennell Coast

zh:霍華德山